Claire Wendling (born 1967) is a French comics author.

Biography

In 1989, while still in the School of Fine Arts of Angoulême, she won the "Artist of the Future" prize at the Angoulême International Comics Festival and participated in two anthologies published by Delcourt, The Children of the Nile and Entrechats. In 1990 began her one and only series Les Lumières de l'Amalou (The lights of Amalou), written by Christophe Gibelin, which won the Press award at Angoulême.

In 1997, she was hired by Warners studio and moved to Los Angeles to participate in various projects including The Quest for Camelot. Failing to acclimatize, she returned to France eight months later and published Desk, a book of sketches made in Los Angeles. In 2000, she did graphic design work for the video game Alone in the Dark IV.

Wendling is an infrequent author: some short stories, a series of sketch books and illustrative works, her complete works are held in a single volume. She has been compared to Régis Loisel, but Wendling is perhaps closer to Anglo-Saxon cartoonists such as Jeffrey Catherine Jones or Mike Mignola.

In 2016 she was one of three shortlisted candidates for the Grand Prix de la ville d'Angoulême, one of the world's most prestigious comics awards, along with Alan Moore and eventual winner Hermann Huppen.

In 2017, she was to be guest of honor at the 75th Worldcon (World Science Fiction Convention), but cancelled due to illness.

Publications

Les Lumières de l'Amalou
written by Christophe Gibelin, Delcourt
 Théo (1990)
 Le Pantin (1991)
 Le Village tordu (1992)
 Gouals (1994)
 Cendres (1996)

Collective
Les enfants du Nil, Carmina & Vittorio (screenplay Christophe Gibelin). 1989, Delcourt.
Entrechats. 1989, Delcourt
La fabrique Delcourt a dix ans.1996, Delcourt
Sales petits contes (written by Yann le Pennetier). 1997, Dupuis
Vampires T.1 (2001), Carabas
Vampires T.2 (couverture) (2002), Carabas

Illustrations
Gatonomor 1994
Planches & Dessins 1995
Iguana Bay 1996
Wendling Portfolio 1997
Desk  1999
Aphrodite vol. 3 (textes de Pierre Louÿs) 2000
Drawers 2001
Daisies - Affogato all'Amarena 2010

References

 (In French)
 (In German)

French comics artists
French illustrators
French women illustrators
French female comics artists
1967 births
Living people